The 25th Emmy Awards, later known as the 25th Primetime Emmy Awards, were handed out on May 20, 1973.  The ceremony was hosted by Johnny Carson.  This would be the final ceremony that included daytime categories, as the Daytime Emmy Awards premiered the next year. Winners are listed in bold and series' networks are in parentheses.

The top shows of the night were All in the Family which won its third consecutive Primetime Emmy Award for Outstanding Comedy Series, and The Waltons. The Waltons, in its first season, had the most major nominations heading into the ceremony (9), and won the most major awards on the night with five.

Winners and nominees
Source:

Programs

Acting

Lead performances

Supporting performances

Single performances

Directing

Writing

Most major nominations
By network 
 CBS – 64
 ABC – 31
 NBC – 28
 PBS – 14

 By program
 The Waltons (CBS) – 9
 Mary Tyler Moore (CBS) – 8
 All in the Family (CBS) / M*A*S*H (CBS) – 7
 That Certain Summer (ABC) – 5
 Columbo (NBC) / The Julie Andrews Hour (ABC) / Kung Fu (ABC) / The Marcus-Nelson Murders (CBS) – 4

Most major awards
By network 
 CBS – 17
 ABC – 11
 PBS – 6
 NBC – 5

 By program
 The Waltons (CBS) – 5
 Mary Tyler Moore (CBS) – 4

Notes

References

External links
 Emmys.com list of 1973 Nominees & Winners
 

025
Primetime Emmy Awards
1973 in Los Angeles
May 1973 events in the United States